Ambrose George is a Dominican politician.  He has served as a member of the House of Assembly of Dominica for the Roseau South Constituency since February 2000. He is the deputy leader of the Dominica Labour Party and has served as Minister of Public Works and Infrastructural Development.

He served as Minister of Finance from 2000 to 2001

In November 2008, Prime Minister Roosevelt Skerritt announced a cabinet reshuffle in which George was not included. He was replaced by the MP for the Mahaut constituency Hon. Rayburn Blackmore as Minister of Public Works and Infrastructural Development.

References

Year of birth missing (living people)
Living people
Dominica Labour Party politicians
Finance ministers of Dominica
Government ministers of Dominica
Members of the House of Assembly of Dominica